Vilca may refer to:

Vilca, a common name for Anadenanthera colubrina
Vilca District, a district in Huancavelica, Peru

People with the surname
Alejandro Vilca (born 1976), Argentine politician
Marco Vilca (born 2000), Peruvian middle-distance runner
María Luisa Vilca (born 1948), Peruvian sprinter
Rodrigo Vilca (born 1999), Peruvian footballer
Susana Vilca (born 1959), Peruvian politician

See also
Vilcha (disambiguation)